Vine Hill Elementary School is an elementary school ranging from kindergarten to fifth grade located in Scotts Valley, California, United States. It is a part of the Scotts Valley Unified School District.

References

Elementary schools in California